Rumina may refer to:

People

 Miranda Rumina, a Slovenian artist
 Rumina, Bulgarian pop-folk singer known for the songs "Zhestoko" and "Neka Opoznaya"
 Rumina Sato, a Japanese martial artist

In mythology

 Rumina, a Roman goddess

In fiction

 Rumina, primary antagonist in the TV series The Adventures of Sinbad

In biology

 Rumina (gastropod), a genus of snails
 Zerynthia rumina, a species of butterfly
 Plural of rumen, first chamber of alimentary canal of ruminant